The 1978 Gael Linn Cup, the most important representative competition for elite level participants in the women's team field sport of camogie, was won by Leinster, who defeated Connacht in the final, played at Na Fianna, Glasnevin. In 1978 the competition was staged at both senior and junior level for the first time. It was also the first time that the semi-finals and finals were played together on consecutive days. It was the last Gael Linn final to be played with the points bar, an eccentric carry-over from the rules of the game as amended by Congress in 1929.

Arrangements
Leinster overcame Munster in the semi-final and Connacht in the final at Na Fianna's grounds at Mobhi Road, Glansnevin, Dublin. Bridget Doyle scored 2–1 in the unusual position of full-forward while Mary Purcell score two more goals for Leinster. Agnes Hourigan wrote in the Irish Press: Their first three points came from Angela Downey, who had a skillful display at left-forward. Equally impressive were the next two points from Ann Downey, both from within 30 metres of her own goal, from placed balls. Mary Purcell had a Leinster goal and was to add another in the second half. The second half was one-sided and the issue was never in doubt once Mary Purcell and Wexford's Bridget Doyle scored goals midway through the period. Connacht's only score was a late goal from Teresa Duane.
First half goals from Sarah Ann Quinn and Noreen O'Prey helped Munster defeat Leinster 5–1 to 3–2 in the junior semi-final and they then defeated Ulster in the final by 3–2 to 2–1 with a late goal by Annette O'Donovan.

Final stages

|}

Junior Final

|}

References

External links
 Camogie Association

1978 in camogie
1978